Nenad Tomović (born 30 August 1987) is a Serbian professional footballer who plays as a defender for Cypriot First Division club AEK Larnaca.

A former Serbian Olympian and U21 international, Tomović made 22 appearances for Serbia at full level between 2008 and 2015.

Club career

Career in Serbia
Born in Kragujevac, Tomović started out at hometown club Radnički. He joined the youth categories of Rad in 2003, alongside Nemanja Pejčinović. In early 2005, Tomović was promoted to the first-team squad, making his first senior appearances during the 2004–05 Serbian Second League.

In January 2006, Tomović was acquired by Red Star Belgrade, alongside Vladan Milosavljev. He subsequently played for the youth team at the 2006 Torneo di Viareggio, before making one senior appearance near the end of the 2005–06 Serbia and Montenegro SuperLiga, as the club won the title. In the summer of 2006, Tomović was loaned back to Rad. He spent one and a half seasons with the Građevinari, before returning to Red Star Belgrade in the 2008 winter transfer window.

Career in Italy
In July 2009, Tomović was officially transferred to Italian club Genoa. He made 19 appearances in all competitions throughout his debut season with the Rossoblù. In the 2011 winter transfer window, Tomović was loaned to Lecce for the remainder of the season. His loan was extended for a further year in June 2011.

On 31 August 2012, Tomović joined Fiorentina in a co-ownership deal with Juan Manuel Vargas moving in the opposite direction. He featured regularly in central defence and at right-back, as the Viola purchased the other half of his rights from Genoa at the end of the season.

On 31 August 2017, Tomović joined Chievo on a season-long loan with an option to buy.

On 24 August 2019, Tomović joined Serie A club SPAL on loan with an obligation to buy.

Career in Cyprus
On 11 August 2022, AEK Larnaca (with Tomović on the team) played the second leg of the 2022–23 UEFA Europa League third qualifying round away in Belgrade against Partizan. After the match, Tomović ran to the sidelines and pushed a local photojournalist to the ground. UEFA's Control, Ethics and Disciplinary Body is yet to discuss this case.

International career
Tomović represented Serbia and Montenegro at the 2005 UEFA European Under-19 Championship. He was subsequently a member of the Serbia squad at the 2008 Summer Olympics. The following year, Tomović represented Serbia at the 2009 UEFA European Under-21 Championship.

Tomović made his full international debut for Serbia on 14 December 2008, playing the full 90 minutes in a 1–0 friendly loss against Poland in Antalya in a squad made up of mainly domestic-based players.

Career statistics

Club

International

Honours
Red Star Belgrade
 First League of Serbia and Montenegro: 2005–06
 Serbia and Montenegro Cup: 2005–06

Fiorentina
 Coppa Italia runner-up: 2013–14

References

External links

 
 
 
 

Living people
1987 births
Sportspeople from Kragujevac
Serbian footballers
Serbia and Montenegro footballers
Association football defenders
Serbia international footballers
Serbia under-21 international footballers
Footballers at the 2008 Summer Olympics
Olympic footballers of Serbia
First League of Serbia and Montenegro players
Serbian First League players
Serbian SuperLiga players
Serie A players
FK Rad players
Red Star Belgrade footballers
Genoa C.F.C. players
U.S. Lecce players
ACF Fiorentina players
A.C. ChievoVerona players
S.P.A.L. players
Serbian expatriate footballers
Serbian expatriate sportspeople in Italy
Expatriate footballers in Italy